The Kanchi Kamakoti CHILDS Trust Hospital is a 200-bed exclusive pediatric care hospital situated in Nungambakkam, Chennai, India. The hospital was founded in April, 1978 as the CHILDS Trust Hospital by late Dr MS Ramakrishnan. In October 1999, the management was taken over by the Kanchi Mutt and was renamed as the Kanchi Kamakoti CHILDS Trust Hospital.

The hospital is a tertiary care referral hospital and is accredited by the NABH. It was named as the best pediatric care hospital in the country by the American magazine Newsweek in 2021.

References 

Children's hospitals in India
Hospitals in Chennai
Pediatrics in India